Plandry is a municipality and village in Jihlava District in the Vysočina Region of the Czech Republic. It has about 200 inhabitants.

Etymology
The name Plandry is derived from the Brandl family, who owned the place in the mid-17th century.

Geography
It lies in the Křemešník Highlands. The municipality is situated on the left bank of the Jihlava River, which forms the southern municipal border. There is a system of ponds, supplied by local brook.

History
The first written mention of Lipový dvůr (a medieval manor house that is the predecessor of the village of Plandry) is from the 15th century and are preserved in the archive of the Želiv monastery, which owned the area at that time. The area was acquired by the Trčka of Lípa family during the Hussite Wars, and in 1596 it became property of the city of Jihlava. In 1630, the Brandl family became the owners of the manor house.

In 1730, the manor house was bought by Josef Ignaz Zebo of Breitenau, who called the place "Breitenhof". Around 1734, he had built a Baroque castle on the site of the manor house. In 1810, the manor was acquired by Aloisie Schirndinger of Schirnding. Her daughter Aloisie married Václav Petr II Dobrzensky of Dobrzenitz. In 1897, two thirds of the castle were inherited by Karl von Wiedersperg, one third belonged to Václav Petr III Dobrzensky of Dobrzenitz. In 1945 the castle and the manor was confiscated and became a state possession.

Demographics

Economy
On an area of over  there is a photovoltaic power station with an output of 700 kWh. Next to the power station is a biogas station with installed electric power of 800 kW.

Sights

After 1945, the castle was converted into apartments and offices, and due to its poor condition, it was demolished in 1998. The adjacent farm and surrounding park with a statue of Saint John of Nepomuk from 1734 and the granary from the 18th century remain protected cultural monuments.

The Chapel of Saint John of Nepomuk was built by Josef Ignaz Zebo in the Baroque style in 1735–1739. It is a pilgrimage site. The main building of the chapel is surrounded by five niche chapels.

References

External links

Villages in Jihlava District